Mohammad Almas Hossain is a Bangladeshi politician and former Member of Parliament.

Early life
Hossain was born into a Bengali Muslim family in Baksiganj, Jamalpur, Mymensingh District.

Career 
During the 1979 Bangladeshi general elections, Hossain was elected as a Member of Parliament for the newly renamed Jamalpur-1 constituency as a Bangladesh Muslim League candidate. He was defeated in the fifth parliamentary elections of 1991 by Jatiya Party politician Abdus Sattar.

References 

Living people
Year of birth missing (living people)
People from Jamalpur District
Bangladesh Muslim League politicians
2nd Jatiya Sangsad members